Nepeta sibirica, the Siberian catmint, is a species of flowering plant in the mint family Lamiaceae, native to Siberia. 

The synonym Dracocephalum sibiricum indicates the shape of the flowers, which resemble a dragon's head.

It prefers a well-drained, moist soil in a sunny southerly or westerly aspect. 

The cultivar 'Souvenir d'André Chaudon' has gained the Royal Horticultural Society's Award of Garden Merit.

References 

 

sibirica
Flora of Siberia
Herbs